Howard Fried (born June 14, 1946, in Cleveland, Ohio) is an American conceptual artist who became known in the 1970s for his pioneering work in video art, performance art, and installation art.

He lives and works in Vallejo, California.

Biography
Howard Fried attended Syracuse University from 1964 to 1967, received his B.F.A. from the San Francisco Art Institute in 1968 and his M.F.A. from the University of California, Davis, in 1970. He founded the video and performance department (currently the New Genres Department) at the San Francisco Art Institute.

Fried is associated with the first generation of conceptual artists in the San Francisco Bay Area, along with Terry Fox, Lynn Hershman, David Ireland, Paul Kos, Stephen Laub, and Tom Marioni, among others. His early works addressed such issues as decision making, conflict situations, control, predictability, learning, and cognitive processes.

Fried has participated in numerous group exhibitions including the 1977, 1979, 1981, and 1983 Whitney Biennial, Whitney Museum of American Art, New York; documenta V, Kassel Germany; Museum of Modern Art, New York; the Institute of Contemporary Art, Boston; Stedelijk Museum, Amsterdam; the Museum of Conceptual Art, San Francisco; the Berkeley Art Museum, University of California; the San Francisco Museum of Modern Art, San Francisco; Museum of Contemporary Art, Los Angeles; J. Paul Getty Museum, Los Angeles; and the CCA Wattis Institute for Contemporary Arts, San Francisco.

Fried has held solo exhibitions at the de Saisset Art Gallery and Museum, University of Santa Clara, California; Nova Scotia College of Art and Design, Halifax, Canada; Everson Museum of Art, Syracuse, New York; San Francisco Museum of Modern Art, San Francisco; Museum of Modern Art, New York; Fort Worth Art Museum, Fort Worth, Texas; and/or, Seattle, Washington; the Berkeley Art Museum, University of California, Berkeley; and apexart, New York, among others. A mid-career retrospective was organized at Berkeley Art Museum, University of California, Berkeley in 1983.

Selected works

The Seven States of Openness (1969–70) – installation, objects, drawings, text
All My Dirty Blue Clothes (1969) – installation
Spectral Analysis (1969) – installation
Studio Relocation(1970) – photo and text
1970 (1970) – Super 8 film installation
Chronometric Depth Perception (1970) – Super 8 film, photo and text
Inside the Harlequin: Approach-Avoidance III and II(1971) – Double Super 8 film installation
Synchromatic Baseball (September 5, 1971) – performance action, 16 Rose Street, San Francisco
40 Winks (December 10, 1971) – performance action, University Art Museum, Berkeley
Fuck You Purdue (1971) – videotape
Sea Sell Sea Sick at Saw Sea Soar (1971) – videotape
The Schizophrenia Projects (1970–71) – installation with text
Drawings 1-9 (1971–74) - drawings
Which Hunt? (1972) – videotape
Indian War Dance / Indian Rope Trick (July 24–25, 1972) – performance action, documenta V, Kassel, Germany
Fireman’s Conflict Resolution (1972, 1978, 1979) – installation
Seaquick (1972) – performance, installation, videotape
Long John Servil vs. Long John Silver (1972) – performance documentation
Interaction performance/installation, April 20, 1973, All Night Sculptures, MOCA and Ghost of the Creamer (1974) – videotape
Sustatense (1974) - videotape, KQED
Derelict (1974) - installation
The Burghers of Fort Worth (1975–76) – performance action, 16mm film transferred to video
Clock of Commercial Significance 1976-80 – photo and text documentation of Synchromatic Baseball, 40 Winks and Portrait by Rumor (Chainsmoke).
Vito's Reef (1978) – videotape
The Museum Reaction Piece (1978–82) – video installation
Condom (1979–80) – videotape
Making a Paid Political Announcement (1981–82) – videotape
Sociopath(1983) – installation
The Edge of the Forest (1983) – installation
Pattern Maker (1984) - installation
Atomic +- Control (1985) - video installation
Commercial Explosion #3 (1986) - installation
Watershed D (1989) - installation

Selected bibliography
 Richardson, Brenda. "Howard Fried: The Paradox of Approach-Avoidance," Arts Magazine, 45 (Summer 1971)
 Bear, Liza. "Howard Fried; The Cheshire Cat," Avalanche, no. 4 (Spring 1972)
 White, Robin. Interview with Howard Fried at Crown Point Press, ‘’View’’. Oakland, California: Crown Point Press, 1979.
 Roth, Moira. "A Star is Born: Performance Art in California," Performing Arts Journal, Vol. 4, No. 3. Cambridge: The MIT Press, 1980.
 Foley, Suzanne. Space Time Sound, Conceptual Art in the San Francisco Bay Area: The 1970s. San Francisco: San Francisco Museum of Modern Art, 1981. 
 Lewallen, Constance. Howard Fried: Works from 1969 to 1983. Berkeley: University Art Museum, University of California, Berkeley, 1983.
 Albright, Thomas. Art of the San Francisco Bay Area, 1945 - 1980. Berkeley: University of California Press, 1985. , 
 University of Massachusetts Amherst, University Gallery. In site: five conceptual artists from the Bay Area: Terry Fox, Howard Fried, David Ireland, Paul Kos, Tom Marioni: University Gallery, Fine Arts Center, University of Massachusetts Amherst, February 2 March 17, 1990. Amherst: University Gallery, University of Massachusetts Amherst, 1990.
 Hall, Doug, Sally Jo Fifer, ed. Illuminating Video: An Essential Guide to Video Art. New York: Aperture Foundation/BAVC, 1991. 
Schimmel, Paul, author. Out of Actions: Between Performance and the Object, 1949-1979. Museum of Contemporary Art, Los Angeles, 1998. 
 Verigne, Lea, ed. Body Art and Performance: The Body As Language. Skira Editore S. p. A., Milan, 2000. 
 Fried, Howard. "Structuring Inside the Harlequin; Watershed; Patternmaker," New Observations, (Fall/Winter 2000)
 Montano, Linda. Performance Artists Talking in the Eighties. Berkeley: University of California Press, 2000.
 Phillips, Glenn, ed. California Video: Artists and Histories. Los Angeles: Getty Research Institute and J. Paul Getty Museum, 2008, 
 Bishop, Janet, Corey Keller, and Sarah Roberts, eds. San Francisco Museum of Modern Art: 75 Years of Looking Forward. San Francisco: SFMOMA. 
 Anker, Steve, Kathy Geritz, and Steve Seid, eds. Radical Light: Alternative Film & Video in the San Francisco Bay Area, 1945-2000 University of California Press: Berkeley and Los Angeles, 2010. 
 Hoffmann, Jens and Paul McCarthy, eds. Paul McCarthy's Low Life, Slow Life, Hatje Cantz, 2010. 
 Schimmel, Paul and Lisa Gabrielle Mark, eds. Under the Big Black Sun: California Art 1974-1981, Prestel USA, 2011. 
 Lewallen, Constance, Karen Moss, Julia Bryan-Wilson, and Anne Rorimer. State of Mind: New California Art Circa 1970, University of California Press, 2011.

References

External links
UbuWeb Anthology of Conceptual Writing: Howard Fried The Cheshire Cat, Part I
SFMOMA - About the Artist
Howard Fried in Paul McCarthy's Low Life Slow Life: Part 2 exhibition, CCA Wattis Institute for Contemporary Arts
Deep Skin Excursion - Early Work by Howard Fried apexart exhibition brochure
Howard Fried / MATRIX 54 Berkeley Art Museum exhibition brochure
"One on One" SFMOMA Open Space blog
The Burghers of Fort Worth at LA MOCA
 Happenstand - stance artist profile
 1984 UCSD lecture
 Limbo artist portrait
An Institutional Approach to the Collections Care of Electronic Art
Daily Serving: "Howard Fried: The Decomposition of My Mother's Wardrobe at The Box"

1946 births
Living people
American conceptual artists
American installation artists
American video artists
American performance artists
Artists from the San Francisco Bay Area
Artists from California
Artists from Cleveland
San Francisco Art Institute alumni
San Francisco Art Institute faculty
University of California, Davis alumni
Artists from Vallejo, California